The Workers' Left League is a Trotskyist political party in Tunisia led by Jalel Ben Brik Zoghlami. The party It participates in the leftist Popular Front. The party has ties to the French New Anticapitalist Party.

References

Communist parties in Tunisia
Political parties with year of disestablishment missing
Political parties with year of establishment missing
Popular Front (Tunisia)
Trotskyist organizations in Africa